Abadam is a remote Local Government Area of Borno State, Nigeria, on the western coast of Lake Chad. It borders Chad and Niger, and it's very close to Cameroon, in 2016 its population is projected to be 140,000 inhabitants, It has its headquarters in the town of Malumfatori. Security, Healthcare, infrastructure, and climate change are some of the major challenges in Abadam Local government.

Landscape 
It has a landmass area of 3,973 km

Population 
Abadam has a total population of100, 180 in 2006 population census

Postal Code 
The postal code of the area is 602.

History 
It is one of the sixteen LGAs that constitute the Borno Emirate, a traditional state located in Borno State, Nigeria.

Cases of Insurgency 
In October 2014, Boko Haram fighters took over Abadam town, with at least 40 deaths, but fled after an attack by Multinational Joint Task Force (MNJTF) troops. Local residents, some of whom had fled to Niger border areas, were urged to return.

On 2 February 2015, the Nigerian Army said it had recaptured Abadam from Boko Haram, along with the nearby towns of Gamboru, Mafa, Mallam Fatori, and Marte, following joint military operations by Nigerian and Cameroonian forces, civilian forces, and three days of Chadian airstrikes. A bomb dropped by an air strike and smashed the midst of a mourning ceremony, which injured 27 peoples and killed 37 persons. Borno State senator Baba Kak Garbai however stated in February 2016 that the group still controlled Abadam. Major General Lucky Irabor also stated in August 2016 that Abadam was under control of the militants.

References

Local Government Areas in Borno State